Hanif means a true believer, a righteous person in Arabic. Hanif may also refer to

Hanif (given name)
Hanif (surname)
Hanif, Iran, a village in Iran

See also 

 Hanife